The NeuroGenderings Network is an international group of researchers in neuroscience and gender studies. Members of the network study how the complexities of social norms, varied life experiences, details of laboratory conditions and biology interact to affect the results of neuroscientific research. Working under the label of "neurofeminism", they aim to critically analyze how the field of neuroscience operates, and to build an understanding of brain and gender that goes beyond gender essentialism while still treating the brain as fundamentally material. Its founding was part of a period of increased interest and activity in interdisciplinary research connecting neuroscience and the social sciences.

History 
The group, comprising scholars who specialized in feminism, queer theory and gender studies, formed to tackle "neurosexism" as defined by Cordelia Fine in her 2010 book Delusions of Gender: "uncritical biases in [neuroscientific] research and public perception, and their societal impacts on an individual, structural, and symbolic level." Research can suffer from neurosexism by failing to include the social factors and expectations that shape sex differences, which possibly leads to making inferences based on flawed data.

By contrast, the network members advocate "neurofeminism", aiming to critically evaluate heteronormative assumptions of contemporary brain research and examine the impact and cultural significance of neuroscientific research on society's views about gender. This includes placing greater emphasis on neuroplasticity rather than biological determinism.

Conferences
In March 2010, the first conference – NeuroGenderings: Critical Studies of the Sexed Brain – was held in Uppsala, Sweden. Organisers Anelis Kaiser and Isabelle Dussauge described its long terms goals "to elaborate a new conceptual approach of the relation between gender and the brain, one that could help to head gender theorists and neuroscientists to an innovative interdisciplinary place, far away from social and biological determinisms but still engaging with the materiality of the brain." The NeuroGenderings Network was established at this event, with the group's first results published in a special issue of the journal Neuroethics.

Further conferences have since been held on a biennial basis: NeuroCultures — NeuroGenderings II, September 2012 at the University of Vienna's physics department; NeuroGenderings III – The First International Dissensus  Conference on Brain and Gender, May 2014 in Lausanne, Switzerland; and NeuroGenderings IV in March 2016, at Barnard College, New York City.

Members 
The members of the NeuroGenderings Network are:

 Robyn Bluhm
 Tabea Cornel
 Isabelle Dussauge
 Gillian Einstein
 Cordelia Fine
 Hannah Fitsch
 Giordana Grossi
 Christel Gumy
 Nur Zeynep Gungor
 Daphna Joel
 Rebecca Jordan-Young
 Anelis Kaiser
 Emily Ngubia Kessé
 Cynthia Kraus
 Victoria Pitts-Taylor
 Gina Rippon
 Deboleena Roy
 Raffaella Rumiati
 Sigrid Schmitz
 Catherine Vidal
 Katherine Bryant

See also 

 Feminist movements and ideologies
 Gender essentialism
 Heteronormativity
 Neuroscience of sex differences
 Neurogender

Bibliography 
Books
 
  Also available to view by chapter online.
 
 

Book chapters
 
 
 
 Kraus, Cynthia (2016), "What is the feminist critique of neuroscience? A call for dissensus studies", in 

Journal articles
 
  Pdf.
 
 

Opposing publications
Below is a list of works which cause the network concern due to their "neurodeterminist notions of a ‘sexed brain’ [which] are being transported into public discourse [..] without reflecting the biases in empirical work."

References

External links 
 

Gender studies
Cognitive neuroscience
Neural circuits
Neuroplasticity
Neuropsychology
Science and culture